Al-Dabaah (also spelled Daba'a) is a village in central Syria, administratively part of the Homs Governorate, located southwest of Homs. Nearby localities include Arjoun to the west, Kafr Mousa and al-Ghassaniyah to the northwest, Daminah al-Gharbiyah to the north, al-Buwaydah al-Sharqiyah and Daminah al-Sharqiyah to the northeast, Shamsin to the east and Jandar to the southeast. According to the Syria Central Bureau of Statistics (CBS), al-Dabaah had a population of 3,129 in the 2004 census.

References

Populated places in al-Qusayr District